The 1956 Georgia Bulldogs football team represented the Georgia Bulldogs of the University of Georgia during the 1956 NCAA University Division football season.

Schedule

Source: GeorgiaDogs.com: 1956 football schedule

Roster
E Ken Cooper

References

Georgia
Georgia Bulldogs football seasons
Georgia Bulldogs football